KEZJ (1450 AM) is a radio station licensed to Twin Falls, Idaho, United States, the station serves the Twin Falls area.  The station is currently owned by Salt & Light Radio, Inc.

References

External links

 

EZJ (AM)
Radio stations established in 1946
1946 establishments in Idaho